Acidihalobacter prosperus  is a halotolerant and acidophile bacterium from the genus of Acidihalobacter which has been isolated from geothermally heated sea sediments near a vulcano in Italy.

References

External links
Type strain of Acidihalobacter prosperus at BacDive -  the Bacterial Diversity Metadatabase	

Chromatiales
Bacteria described in 2015
Halophiles
Acidophiles